How Can I Unlove You is an album by country music singer Lynn Anderson, released in 1971.

The album's title is derived from Anderson's No. 1 hit single late that year, "How Can I Unlove You". Written by Joe South (who had previously written her 1970 No. 1 country and pop hit, "(I Never Promised You A) Rose Garden"), the song also reached No. 63 on the pop music chart and No. 30 on the adult contemporary chart, and was Anderson's third No. 1 hit. This album includes covers of such songs as John Denver's "Take Me Home, Country Roads" and Freddie Hart's "Easy Loving". The album also includes a remake of Anderson's mother Liz's 1970 minor hit, "All Day Sucker".

How Can I Unlove You reached the No. 2 position on the Top Country Albums chart as well as reaching No. 132 on the Billboard Top LPs chart — one of the most successful albums Anderson released during her career.

Track listing
"How Can I Unlove You" (Joe South)
"Don't Say Things You Don't Mean" (Glenn Sutton)
"You've Got a Friend" (Carole King)
"Easy Loving" (Freddie Hart)
"Here I Go Again" (Ted Harris)
"What's Made Milwaukee Famous (Has Made a Loser Out of Me)" (Sutton)
"Take Me Home, Country Roads" (John Denver, Bill Danoff, Taffy Nivert)
"There's Never Been Anyone Like You" (Jerry Foster, Bill Rice)
"All Day Sucker" (Liz Anderson, Casey Anderson)
"That's What Loving You Has Meant to Me" (Sutton)
"Simple Words" (Sutton)

Charts

Weekly charts

Year-end charts

References

External links
LP Discography entry.

1971 albums
Lynn Anderson albums
Albums produced by Glenn Sutton
Albums produced by Clive Davis
Columbia Records albums